Shui Pin Tsuen is a village in Wang Chau, Yuen Long District, Hong Kong.

Administration
Shui Pin Tsuen is a recognized village under the New Territories Small House Policy. It is one of the 37 villages represented within the Ping Shan Rural Committee. For electoral purposes, Shui Pin Tsuen is part of the Ping Shan Central constituency, which is currently represented by Felix Cheung Chi-yeung.

Features
Originally built in 1925 in Tung Tau Tsuen, Ss. Peter and Paul Church was relocated and rebuilt at No. 201 Castle Peak Road, near Shui Pin Tsuen, in 1958.

See also
 Shui Pin Wai
 Shui Pin Wai Estate
 Shui Pin Wai stop

References

External links

 Delineation of area of existing village Shui Pin Tsuen (Ping Shan) for election of resident representative (2019 to 2022)
 Antiquities Advisory Board. Historic Building Appraisal. Shrine Shui Pin Tsuen, Wang Chau Pictures
 Antiquities Advisory Board. Historic Building Appraisal. Ss. Peter and Paul Church, No. 201 Castle Peak Road, Yuen Long Pictures

Villages in Yuen Long District, Hong Kong
Wang Chau (Yuen Long)